is a Japanese voice actress who is previously affiliated with Clare Voice. She played leading roles in each series, including Tawawa on Monday, Urara Meirocho, Aho-Girl, UQ Holder! and The Idolmaster Cinderella Girls.

Biography
Harada was born in Chiba Prefecture. After thinking about what course to take after graduating from high school, she decided to enter a voice acting school in 2015. She had not seen much anime neither manga.

Harada appeared in minor roles in anime series such as Lostorage Incited WIXOSS and Time Bokan 24. She first played a lead role in an anime series as the character Ai-chan in the original net animation short series Tawawa on Monday in 2016. Her next main role was as Chiya, the protagonist of the 2017 anime television series Urara Meirocho. Harada had auditioned for the role, and was given it after a number of re-recordings. She also read the manga afterwards, describing Chiya as a "bright, pure, straightforward, and cute little thing." Harada, Kaede Hondo, Yurika Kubo and Haruka Yoshimura, performed the series' opening theme . Her next main role is Miyu Mifune in The Idolmaster Cinderella Girls, a role she reprised from the original game. She also played the role of Sayaka Sumino in Aho-Girl, and will play the role of Shinobu Yūki in the anime television series UQ Holder!. She is one of the cast members singing for the series' opening and ending themes. On July 31, 2019, it was announced that she left Clare Voice to become a freelancer.

Filmography

Television animation

OVAs/ONAs
Tawawa on Monday (2016), Ai
A.I.C.O. -Incarnation- (2018), Yuzuha Isazu
Tawawa on Monday 2 (2021), Ai

Video games
The Idolmaster Cinderella Girls: Starlight Stage (2015), Miyu Mifune
Azur Lane (2017), Dunkerque, Haruna
Princess Connect! Re:Dive (2018), Ranpha
Blue Archive (2021), Ayane Okusora

Notes

References

External links

1997 births
Living people
Voice actresses from Chiba Prefecture
Japanese video game actresses
Japanese voice actresses
21st-century Japanese actresses